The Express Tribune is a daily English-language newspaper based in Pakistan. It is the flagship publication of the Daily Express media group. It is Pakistan's only internationally affiliated newspaper in a partnership with the International New York Times, the global edition of The New York Times. Headquartered in Karachi, it also prints copy from offices in Lahore, Islamabad, and Peshawar.

History
It was launched in 12 April 2010, in broadsheet format, with a news design distinctive from traditional Pakistani newspapers.

Its editorial stance identifies with social liberalism, and its readership is generally on the mainstream left of Pakistani political and social opinion. Topics the newspaper covers include politics, international affairs, economics, investment, sports, and culture. It runs a glossy called Express Tribune Magazine on Sunday, which includes social commentary, interviews, and a four-page supplement with recipes, reviews, travel advice, blogs, and technology news. As of 2012, it had the widest online readership in the country locally and internationally.

Part of Express media group
The Express Tribune joins other brands of the Express media group including the Urdu-language Daily Express newspaper. It is accompanied by a twenty-four-hour Urdu news channel, Express News, and an Urdu entertainment channel, Express Entertainment. It also contains a technology supplement called '@internet'. It used to run an English-language news channel called Express 24/7, now defunct.

The paper's stated mission is "to defend the liberal values and egalitarian traditions we believe in, and which deserve to be upheld in writing that is both informative and insightful".

Staff
The publisher of The Express Tribune, Bilal Ali Lakhani, is the son of Sultan Ali Lakhani. Its first managing editor, Muhammad Ziauddin, was previously associated with Dawn. Its first editor, Kamal Siddiqi, was previously associated with The News. At present, the executive editor of The Express Tribune is Fahd Hussain while Naveed Hussain is its editor.

The editorial consultant is Abul Hasanat, previously city editor of Dawn. The op-ed editor is Omar R. Quraishi, who was also previously associated with Dawn. The photographer Athar Khan was previously associated with The News Karachi.

Columnists
Prominent columnists for The Express Tribune include investigative reporter Naveed Ahmad, former caretaker finance minister Shahid Javed Burki,  The Express Tribune Publisher M. Bilal Lakhani, retired ambassador and former Interior secretary Rustam Shah Mohmand, retired lieutenant general and former federal secretary Talat Masood, Former General Manager of Gulf News Anwer Mooraj, Urdu scholar and University of Chicago Professor C. M. Naim, Amnesty International (India) Executive Director Aakar Patel, American journalist and academic Faisal Kutty, Retired Brigadier Shaukat Qadir, former Executive Editor of The Express Tribune M. Ziauddin, and Foreign Editor Robin Fernandez. Shahid Mahmood is one of the paper's political cartoonists. In addition to that, various independent journalists also contribute to The Express Tribune. The Express Tribune also accepts blog posts from individuals.

Access
The Express Tribune is available online via e-paper and through a live website that includes news and blogs. The print edition is available through hawker, via subscription, or at newsstands. The print edition includes a six-day-a-week copy of the Asia edition of the International Herald Tribune.

The Express Tribune is a supporter of The Citizens Foundation (TCF), a local not-for-profit organisation providing education to children in need. Up to 30 percent of subscription profits are donated to the TCF.

Terrorist attack and self-censorship
On December 2, 2013, Express Media Group's offices were targeted in a terrorist attack in which 3 staff workers were killed. Pakistani politician Altaf Hussain condemned the attack and said that it is the obligation of the government to ensure the safety of the people. TTP later took responsibility for the attacks and declared the paper to be propagating against their militant group, citing it as their reason for the attack.

In March 2014, a New York Times story about what Pakistan officials knew in regard to Osama bin Laden's presence in the country was censored from the front page of the International New York Times in Pakistan by the local distributor, The Express Tribune.

In 2016, a Chinese court accepted to hear a case regarding the issue of same-sex marriage. As such, the case got substantial coverage. However, in the Pakistani version (The Express Tribune) of the International New York Times, the picture accompanying this news story was censored and a blank space was left on the front page of the newspaper. Daily Times columnist Farman Nawaz raised several questions about this type of journalism in Pakistan.

See also

 List of newspapers in Pakistan

References

External links
 

Daily newspapers published in Pakistan
English-language newspapers published in Pakistan
Lakson Group
Liberalism in Pakistan
Mass media in Karachi
Progressivism in Pakistan
Secularism in Pakistan
The New York Times
2010 establishments in Pakistan